The 2013 USASA Region III National Cup is a qualifying tournament that will determine which clubs from the third region of the United States Adult Soccer Association qualify for the first round proper of the 2013 U.S. Open Cup. The Region III National Cup's group matches took place on 12–13 April 2013 with the semifinals taking place on 14 April 2013.

Qualification 
 ASC New Stars (Texas South)
 Barracudas FC (Texas South)
 Motagua New Orleans (Louisiana)
 Dallas TNT (North Texas)
 FC Rahr (North Texas)
 Islanders FC (Texas South)
 Los Lobos (Oklahoma)
 NTX Rayados (North Texas)
 Red Force (Florida)

Group Phase

Group A

Group B

Group C

Ranking of 2nd Place Teams

Knockout phase

See also 
 2013 U.S. Open Cup
 2013 U.S. Open Cup qualification
 United States Adult Soccer Association

References

External links 

2013 U.S. Open Cup
2013
2012